Novel Nature is an alternative rock band from Seattle, Washington, United States. The band comprises songwriters/producers Shane Lance (lead vocals, guitars, keyboards) and Emerson Shotwell (drums, percussion).

Formation

Shane Lance and Emerson Shotwell first met during elementary school.  They began playing in bands throughout their junior high and high school days. After the disbandment of rock band Roman Holiday, Shotwell and Lance decided to start the new two-piece band.

The group released Nylon Nation in 2014, and followed with a standalone single, "Gunfight", in 2017. The full-length Irregular Heartbeats was released in 2021.

Discography
Albums
Nylon Nation (2014)
Irregular Heartbeats (2021)

Singles
"Gunfight" (2017)

Members
 Shane Lance – lead vocals, guitars, keys (2013–present)
 Emerson Shotwell – drums, percussion (2013–present)

References

External links
Novel Nature Soundcloud
Novel Nature Facebook Page

Alternative rock groups from Washington (state)
Musical groups from Seattle